Juan Villalba can refer to:

 Juan Bautista Villalba, Paraguayan footballer
 Juan Manuel Villalba, Paraguayan footballer